The 1957 VFL Night Premiership Cup was the Victorian Football League end of season cup competition played in August, September and October of the 1957 VFL Premiership Season. This was the second edition that the VFL Night Series had existed with the competition expanding to feature all twelve teams. The games were being played at the Lake Oval, Albert Park, then the home ground of South Melbourne, as it was the only ground equipped to host night games.

In the final,  took out their second night series cup, defeating  by 51 points (15.13.103 to 8.4.52). This would later be the only edition until 1977 to feature all twelve teams at the time.

Games

Round 1

|- bgcolor="#CCCCFF"
| Winning team
| Winning team score
| Losing team
| Losing team score
| Ground
| Crowd
| Date
|- bgcolor="#FFFFFF"
| 
| 15.19 (109)
| 
| 11.13 (79)
| Lake Oval
| 25,000
| Thursday, 29 August
|- bgcolor="#FFFFFF"
| 
| 13.13 (91)
| 
| 9.12 (66)
| Lake Oval
| 14,000
| Tuesday, 3 September
|- bgcolor="#FFFFFF"
| 
| 9.13 (67)
| 
| 6.13 (49)
| Lake Oval
| 16,500
| Thursday, 5 September
|- bgcolor="#FFFFFF"
| 
| 16.17 (113)
| 
| 12.8 (80)
| Lake Oval
| 16,500
| Tuesday, 10 September

Round 2

|- bgcolor="#CCCCFF"
| Winning team
| Winning team score
| Losing team
| Losing team score
| Ground
| Crowd
| Date
|- bgcolor="#FFFFFF"
| 
| 8.14 (62)
| 
| 6.11 (47)
| Lake Oval
| 25,000
| Thursday, 12 September
|- bgcolor="#FFFFFF"
| 
| 11.10 (76)
| 
| 7.15 (57)
| Lake Oval
| 14,000
| Thursday, 19 September
|- bgcolor="#FFFFFF"
| 
| 11.18 (84)
| 
| 10.12 (72)
| Lake Oval
| 8,100
| Tuesday, 24 September
|- bgcolor="#FFFFFF"
| 
| 11.16 (82)
| 
| 8.8 (56)
| Lake Oval
| 10,000
| Thursday, 26 September

Semifinals

|- bgcolor="#CCCCFF"
| Winning team
| Winning team score
| Losing team
| Losing team score
| Ground
| Crowd
| Date
|- bgcolor="#FFFFFF"
| 
| 10.11 (71)
| 
| 6.9 (45)
| Lake Oval
| 14,600
| Thursday, 3 October
|- bgcolor="#FFFFFF"
| 
| 17.14 (116)
| 
| 15.14 (104)
| Lake Oval
| 18,500
| Friday, 4 October

Final

|- bgcolor="#CCCCFF"
| Winning team
| Winning team score
| Losing team
| Losing team score
| Ground
| Crowd
| Date
|- bgcolor="#FFFFFF"
| 
| 15.13 (103)
| 
| 8.4 (52)
| Lake Oval
| 25,000
| Monday, 7 October

See also
List of Australian Football League night premiers
1957 VFL season

References

External links
 1957 VFL Night Premiership - detailed review including quarter-by-quarter scores, best players and goalkickers for each match

Australian Football League pre-season competition